Josef "Sepp" Lenz (born 8 February 1934 in Königssee) is a West German luger who competed in the 1960s. He won the gold medal in the men's singles event at the 1962 FIL European Luge championships in Weissenbach, Austria.

Lenz competed in the men's singles event at the 1964 Winter Olympics, but was severely injured at the luge track in Igls and did not compete as a result.

Lenz later became a luge coach, being involved the early career of Austria's Markus Prock. In 1966 he became coach of the German national team, a position he held until 1995. Under his leadership the national team won 31 gold, 31 silver and 34 bronze medals at the Olympics, World Championships and European Championships. Lugers who he guided to success included double World Champion and future International Luge Federation President Josef Fendt, 1984 Winter Olympic doubles champions Hans Stangassinger and Franz Wembacher, and triple Olympic champion Georg Hackl. Along with his father, he also constructed a naturally refrigerated luge track on the banks of the Königssee, the forerunner to the present artificial Königssee track. He subsequently designed other tracks, including the Utah Olympic Park Track, and acted as a consultant for the Alpensia Sliding Centre.

In December 1993, Lenz lost his left leg below the knee when he did not get out of the way of an American luger while clearing off the ice at the bobsleigh, luge, and skeleton track in Winterberg, Germany. Lenz returned to coach the German team at the 1994 Winter Olympics in Lillehammer two months later.

References

CNN/SI article featuring Lenz at the 1998 Winter Olympics in Nagano.
New York Times article by Christopher Clarey in 1994 on Lenz's return from his 1993 accident.
Wallenchinsky, David. (1984). "Men's Singles Luge". In The Complete Book of the Olympics: 1896-1980. New York: Penguin Books. p. 575.

1934 births
Living people
German male lugers
Lugers at the 1964 Winter Olympics
Olympic lugers of the United Team of Germany
German sports coaches
People from Berchtesgadener Land
Sportspeople from Upper Bavaria